The Douglas A-1 Skyraider, a single-seat attack bomber was operated by eight countries outside of the main user - the United States.

Operators

Cambodia
Khmer Royal Aviation (AVRK)

Central African Republic
Central African Republic Air Force

Chad
 
Chad Air Force

France
Armée de l'Air
 Escadron 2/20 Ouarsenis
 Escadron 1/20 Aures-Nementchas
 Escadron 3/20 Oranie
 Escadron d'Appui Aerien 1/21
 Escadron de Marche 2/21
 Escadrille Legere d'Appui Aerien 1/22 Ain

Gabon
Garde Présidentielle - Presidential Guard

South Vietnam

Republic of Vietnam Air Force
 514th Fighter Squadron (formerly 1st Fighter Squadron)
 516th Fighter Squadron (formerly 2nd Fighter Squadron)
 518th Fighter Squadron
 520th Fighter Squadron
 522nd Fighter Squadron
 524th Fighter Squadron
 530th Fighter Squadron

Sweden

Svensk Flygtjänst AB operated 14 ex-Royal Navy Fleet Air Arm Skyraiders, modified for use as target tugs for the Swedish Air Force.

United Kingdom
The Royal Navy received 50 AD-4Ws  which were given the designation Skyraider AEW.1 These were used from 1951 until 1962.
Fleet Air Arm
849 Naval Air Squadron
778 Naval Air Squadron (RNAS Culdrose, aircrew training 1951-1952)

United States

United States Air Force
 1st Air Commando Squadron, Composite (later 1st Air Commando, Fighter; and 1st Special Operations Squadron) "Hobo"
 6th Special Operations Squadron "Spad"
 22d Special Operations Squadron "Zorro"
 602d Air Commando Squadron (later 602d Fighter Squadron (Commando); and 602d Special Operations Squadron) "Firefly"
 4407th Combat Crew Training Squadron

United States Navy
 VA-1L
 VFAW-4
 VAW-11
 VAW-12
 VAW-13
 VA-3: VA-3B/VA-44 (AD-1)
 VA-4:  VA-4B/VA-45 (AD-1)
 VA-15
 VA-16
 VA-19A: VA-19A (AD-1)
 VA-24
 VA-25 (A-1H) 
 VAQ-33 (EA-1F)
 VA-34
 VA-35
 VA-42
 VA-45
 VA-52 (A-1H)
 VA-54
 VA-55 (AD-4)
 VA-64
 VA-65
 VA-74
 VA-75
VA-85
 VA-95
 VA-104
 VA-105
 VA-114
 VA-115
 VA-122
 VA-125
 VA-126
 VA-135
 VA-145 (A-1H)
 VA-152
 VA-154
 VA-155
 VA-165
 VA-174
 VA-175
 VA-176 (A-1H)
 VA-195
 VA-196
 VA-215

United States Marine Corps

''Note - only VMA-121, VMA-251 and VMC-1 flew the AD-1 during combat missions in the Korean War.
 VMC-1
 VMC-2
 VMC-3
 VMAT-10
 VMAT-20
 VMA-121 (AD-3)
 VMA-211
 VMA-212
 VMA-225
 VMA-251
 VMA-324
 VMA-331
 VMA-332

Vietnam
 
Vietnam operated some captured South Vietnamese aircraft.
Vietnam People's Air Force (also known as the North Vietnam Air Force)

References 

 Abledogs: List of Navy and Air Force Squadrons
Notes

Bibliography

Lists of military units and formations by aircraft
A-1 Skyraider